Janya ragas are Carnatic music ragas derived from the fundamental set of 72 ragas called Melakarta ragas, by the permutation and combination of the various ascending and descending notes. The process of deriving janya ragas from the parent melakartas is complex and leads to an open mathematical possibility of around thirty thousand ragas. Though limited by the necessity of the existence of individual swaroopas (unique identities) for the janya ragas, a list is never comprehensive or exhaustive. Thus the list below is open to additions or corrections. Moreover, some musicians experiment and use new scales, leading to new janya ragas. The 72 Melakarta ragas are numbered according to the ancient Indian system for numerical notation — the Katapayadi system.

The melakartas are listed by numbers 1-72, with corresponding asampoorna melakarta names and scales listed just below (if different, in bold). Under those musical scales are the janyas associated with each melakarta. If the raga has multiple scales in the same janya, these are given below the main scale. Other janya ragas that are either not associated with a melakarta or whose scales are not yet added in this list, are listed at the bottom.

Scales

Other janyas

See also

 List of film songs based on ragas
 List of composers who created ragas

Notes

External links
 karnATik.com: Raaga Janya list
 Carnatica.net: Music Handbook

 
India music-related lists